"L.A. International Airport" is a song written by Leanne Scott.The song was first recorded by David Frizzell in 1970.  It reached #67 on the Billboard Country Singles chart.

Susan Raye recording
Susan Raye recorded her version of the song in 1971, which became an international hit. It reached #9 on the Billboard Country Singles chart. On other charts, "L.A. International Airport" reached #54 on the Billboard Hot 100. The song enjoyed much greater success outside of America and was a major pop hit in many countries, including New Zealand where it hit number one in New Zealand, and in Australia where it peaked at number two and ranked in the top five hits of the year.

The song was rerecorded with updated lyrics in 2003 by Shirley Myers for the 75th Anniversary of LAX.  Susan Raye, who has been retired from the music industry since 1986, made a rare public appearance to sing her hit at a concert at the celebration and to be on hand when a proclamation was issued to make the song the official song of LAX.

Chart performance

Weekly singles charts

Year-end charts

References

External links
 Lyrics of this song
 

1970 songs
1971 singles
Susan Raye songs
Capitol Records singles
David Frizzell songs
Number-one singles in New Zealand
Los Angeles International Airport